The 1992 Ugandan Super League was the 25th season of the official Ugandan football championship, the top-level football league of Uganda.

Overview
The 1992 Uganda Super League was contested by 14 teams and was won by SC Villa, while Spear Motors FC, Entebbe Works FC and Green Valley were relegated.

League standings

Leading goalscorer
The top goalscorer in the 1992 season was Majid Musisi of SC Villa with 29 goals.

Footnotes

External links
 Uganda - List of Champions - RSSSF (Hans Schöggl)
 Ugandan Football League Tables - League321.com

Ugandan Super League seasons
1
Uganda
Uganda